MORENA is a major Mexican left-wing political party. It is described as an anti-neoliberal and populist party. It is the ruling party of Mexico since 2018.

The name is an acronym for the Movimiento Regeneración Nacional (National Regeneration Movement), and means brown-skinned in Spanish. It also alludes to Mexico's Catholic national patroness: the Virgin of Guadalupe, known as 'La Morena'.

Established as a non-profit organization in 2011 and formally registered as a political party in 2014, it was led by three-time presidential candidate and current President of Mexico, Andrés Manuel López Obrador (AMLO), until 12 December 2017, when he registered as a candidate for the party's nomination, and was succeeded by Yeidckol Polevnsky.

For the 2018 general elections, it formed the coalition Juntos Haremos Historia (Together we will make history) with the left-wing Labor Party and the Christian conservative Social Encounter Party. It won the presidency with 53% of the popular vote, and won a majority in both the Senate and Chamber of Deputies.

MORENA was part of the Juntos Hacemos Historia alliance for the 2021 legislative elections.

History

Civil Association 
It was founded as a civil association on October 2, 2011. The party's initial objective was to channel the political movement towards the Mexican elections in July 2012.

After the 2012 elections, the movement resolved on November 20, 2012, to transition from a social movement into a political party.

After holding the first Morena National Congress on November 20, 2012, the delegates from the 32 states of the country named 300 councillors that would form Morena National Council. The statues and plan of action for the party organisms were accepted. The councillors chose Andrés Manuel López Obrador as president of the National Council and Martí Batres Guadarrama as president of the National Executive Committee.

Early years (2011–2016)
MORENA was officially founded by Andrés Manuel López Obrador (AMLO) as a non-profit, structured as a democratic socio-political movement to protest against political corruption, electoral fraud and the policies of what he labeled the "power mafia". Drawing support from the Yo Soy 132 student movement it became a cross-party organization supporting his candidacy for the Presidency in the 2012 general election on 2 October 2011. Following López Obrador's loss in the 2012 election, he left his former party, the Party of the Democratic Revolution (PRD), and MORENA transformed from a movement into a political party, with López Obrador as its leader. A couple of days after his departure from the PRD, federal deputy Ricardo Monreal stated it was a "divorce of convenience," and that López Obrado did the most responsible thing in order to avoid the polarization of the country. According to a 2012 poll, the majority of the Mexican public had a negative view on the establishment of MORENA as a political party. On 7 January 2014, Martí Batres, president of MORENA, presented documents to the National Electoral Institute (INE) for its registration as a political party.

In 2014, López Obrador revealed why he left the PRD, stating, "I left the PRD because the leaders of that party betrayed the people, they went with Peña Nieto and approved the Pact for Mexico, which is nothing more than a 'Pact against Mexico.' I can not be in a party where tax increases were approved and it was approved that they will increase the price of gasoline every month. Gasoline in Mexico costs more than in the United States, the salary in Mexico is the lowest in the entire North American continent, and instead of asking for wage increases, the PRD rose to the podium to ask for the increase in the price of gasoline, it's an embarrassment." After Cuauhtémoc Cárdenas criticized him for forming his own political party, on 7 July 2014, López Obrador posted on social media that, "PRD leaders and most of its legislators voted for the fiscal reforms [raising taxes and gas prices] and with their collaboration they paved the way for privatization of the oil industry." On 10 July 2014, the INE approved MORENA as an official political party to receive federal funds and to participate in the 2015 legislative elections.

2015 Mexican legislative elections

The 2015 legislative elections was the first election where MORENA participated as an official political party. It won 35 seats in the Chamber of Deputies: 14 district seats plus 21 proportional seats.

Juntos Haremos Historia (2017–present)

The 2018 general election was the first presidential election in which MORENA participated. MORENA fought the election in coalition with socialist Labor Party (PT) and the right-wing Christian-conservative Social Encounter Party (PES) under the name Juntos Haremos Historia.

Background

On 24 June 2017, the PT agreed to fight the 2018 election in an electoral alliance with MORENA; however the coalition was not officially registered with the National Electoral Institute (INE), the country's electoral authority. For MORENA, the alliance was facilitated by the withdrawal of the PT's candidate Óscar González Yáñez, who resigned his candidacy and called for votes in favor of Delfina Gómez Álvarez, standard-bearer in the state elections of the State of Mexico in 2017.

In October 2017, at PT's National Congress, as party president Alberto Anaya was reelected to another 6-year term, PT formalized its coalition with MORENA.

Initially, there was speculation about the possibility of a front grouping all Mexican left-wing parties: MORENA, the PRD, PT and Movimiento Ciudadano (MC). However, López Obrador rejected agreement due to political differences, especially after the elections in the State of Mexico, when the candidates of the PRD and MC continued with their campaigns refusing to support the MORENA candidate. At the end of November 2017, the leaders of MORENA and the PES announced that they were in talks to form a possible alliance: Hugo Eric Flores Cervantes, president of the PES, said "We don't negotiate with the PRI, we have two options, to go alone or with MORENA."

Confirmation

On 13 December 2017, PES joined the coalition between MORENA and the PT, and it was formalized under the name Juntos Haremos Historia (English: Together We Will Make History). Following the signing of the agreement, López Obrador was appointed as a pre-candidate for the three parties. It was a partial coalition that supported López Obrador as the presidential candidate and divided the legislative elections between the three: MORENA chose candidates in 150 federal electoral districts (out of 300) and 32 Senate rates, while the PT and the PES each nominated 75 candidates for the Chamber of Deputies and 16 for the Senate.

The alliance received criticism as it was a coalition between two left-wing parties (MORENA and the PT) with a formation related to the evangelical right (PES). In response, MORENA national president Yeidckol Polevnsky said that her party believes in inclusion and team work to "rescue Mexico" and that they will continue to defend human rights; in turn, Hugo Eric Flores Cervantes, national president of the PES, said that "the only possibility of real change in our country is the one headed by Andrés Manuel López Obrador" and that his party had decided to be "on the right side of history."

Results

Following the results on 1 July 2018, candidate Andrés Manuel López Obrador won the presidential election with 53% of the popular vote. MORENA won a total of 55 seats in the Senate: 42 constituency seats and 13 proportional representation seats. It won 156 seats in the Chamber of Deputies: 106 based on district and 85 proportional representation seats. It also won 4 governorships: Mexico City, Chiapas, Tabasco, and Veracruz.

Post-2018 election

In early-2019, 9 deputies from the PRD left the party and joined the MORENA-led government coalition of López Obrador and giving the government a two-thirds majority, allowing for the passage of constitutional reform.

In June 2021 midterm elections, the party won seven seats in the Chamber of Deputies, MORENA's coalition lost seats in the lower house of Congress. The ruling coalition maintained a simple majority, but it failed to secure the two-thirds congressional supermajority.

Ideology
MORENA describes itself as a democratic left-wing party which supports ethnic, religious, cultural and sexual diversity, respect for human rights and environmental care. It describes itself as an opponent to the neoliberal economic policies that Mexico began adopting in the 1980s. MORENA states that a new economic model is needed after the failures of neoliberalism in Mexico, which has resulted in increased corruption and inequality. The party supports "development through private and social business, promoting market competition, but exercising State responsibility in the strategic activities which the Constitution states", and proposes "a model that strengthens the inner market, fair wages; a model that promotes syndical freedom and democracy, where the State doesn't intervene in the inner affairs of the trade organizations".

The party sets to stop the privatization of Pemex and the granting of lands to foreign mining companies who "devastate the lands, pay no taxes and harm the environment".

On social issues, the party's platform embraces a progressive agenda in favour of women's rights and the LGBT community in Mexico, supporting causes such as same-sex marriage and the decriminalisation of abortion at the national level. It is worth noting that Andrés Manuel López Obrador became the first Mexican president-elect to include the LGBT community in an election victory speech. Almost a year later, on 17 May 2019, Lopez Obrador officially decreed the "National Day against Homophobia, Lesbophobia, Transphobia and Biphobia" in Mexico.

The party advocates an alternative security strategy to the war on drugs, which was implemented in the country during the presidency of Felipe Calderón (2006-2012) and which they oppose, arguing that it is a "failed" strategy that has only sown "insecurity and instability" among Mexicans. Among other things, they advocate the legalisation of drugs, such as marijuana, considering that such a proposal would make it possible to find "mechanisms for peace and the reconstruction of the social fabric".

MORENA also declares to be in favor of improving conditions of the Indigenous peoples of Mexico and to carry out the 1996 San Andrés Accords, which were signed by the EZLN and representatives of the Mexican government, but later unenforced by then-President Ernesto Zedillo.

The party states to be against the monopolization of the mass media, especially television, by Televisa and TV Azteca, which in 2018 owned 90% of Mexican television.

Contrary to other parties of the left, MORENA has not sought to reduce inequality by increasing taxes on the wealthy. Instead, the party has focused on reducing the pay gap between lower-level employees and high-level government workers salaries, such as politicians and judges through austerity measures. The party announced support for a plan by López Obrador to cut salaries of the higher-ranking public officials (including the President), lay off up to 70 percent of non-unionized federal workers, and reduce spending by cracking down on corruption and tax fraud. As Article 94 of the Mexican Constitution prohibits reducing the salary of judges at any time during their appointment in order to maintain judicial independence, judges on the Supreme Court took a 25% pay cut starting in 2019.

Pragmatism
Various outlets have described MORENA as "not in the strict sense a political party, but an alliance of diverse movements and political actors, whose main reference is its founder and presidential candidate, Andrés Manuel López Obrador." Due to AMLO's pragmatism, some critics have claimed that MORENA is subject to Obrador's own decisions rather than having a more consistent ideology as a party. A 2018 article in the magazine Clarín describes MORENA's position as "oscillating between populism and social democracy".

Electoral history

Presidential elections

Legislative elections
Chamber of Deputies

Senate elections

List of Party Presidents

See also
 Yo Soy 132
 2012 Mexican elections protests
 #1DMX – 2012 presidential inauguration civil unrest
 Mexican Indignados Movement
 Big tent
 List of political parties in Mexico
 History of democracy in Mexico

References

External links
 Official website (López Obrador) 

 
2011 establishments in Mexico
Foro de São Paulo
Political parties established in 2014
Political parties in Mexico